The 1996 Texas Tech Red Raiders football team represented Texas Tech University as a member of the newly-formed Big 12 Conference during the 1996 NCAA Division I-A football season. In their tenth season under head coach Spike Dykes, the Red Raiders compiled a 7–5 record (5–3 against Big 12 opponents), finished in second place in Southern Division of the Big 12, outscored opponents by a combined total of 323 to 232, and lost to Iowa in the 1996 Alamo Bowl. The team played its home games at Clifford B. and Audrey Jones Stadium in Lubbock, Texas.

Schedule

Roster

Game summaries

at Kansas State

vs. Oklahoma State

at Georgia

Utah State

Baylor

at Kansas

Nebraska

at Texas A&M

Texas

Southwestern Louisiana

at Oklahoma

vs. Iowa (Alamo Bowl)

References

Texas Tech
Texas Tech Red Raiders football seasons
Texas Tech Red Raiders football